Chu Jiang may refer to:

Chu Jiang (PRC) Chinese Communist Party official born in 1917, former Provincial Secretary of Jiangsu Province.
Yama (Buddhism and Chinese mythology) One of the ten Yama Kings of the Chinese Underworld.